Standings and results for Group A of the UEFA Euro 2008 qualifying tournament.

Poland secured qualification to the tournament proper on 17 November 2007 following a 2–0 win against Belgium, becoming the eighth team in the whole of the qualification stage to do so. Portugal secured qualification to the tournament proper on 21 November 2007 following a 0–0 draw against Finland, becoming the thirteenth team in the whole of the qualification stage to do so.

Standings

Matches
Group A fixtures were negotiated at a meeting between the participants on 10 February 2006.

Goalscorers

Notes

References

External links
UEFA website

Group A
2006 in Kazakhstani football
2007 in Kazakhstani football
2006 in Armenian football
2007 in Armenian football
2006 in Finnish football
2007 in Finnish football
2007–08 in Polish football
2006–07 in Polish football
2007–08 in Portuguese football
2006–07 in Portuguese football
2007–08 in Azerbaijani football
2006–07 in Azerbaijani football
2007–08 in Belgian football
2006–07 in Belgian football
2007–08 in Serbian football
2006–07 in Serbian football
Poland at UEFA Euro 2008
Portugal at UEFA Euro 2008